in Abiko, Chiba, is a Japanese professional swimmer, specialising in open water swimming. He competed at the 2012 Summer Olympics and 2016 Olympics, finishing in 15th and 8th place respectively.

References

1990 births
Living people
People from Abiko, Chiba
Japanese male long-distance swimmers
Olympic swimmers of Japan
Swimmers at the 2012 Summer Olympics
Swimmers at the 2016 Summer Olympics
Universiade medalists in swimming
Universiade bronze medalists for Japan
People from Chiba Prefecture
Medalists at the 2011 Summer Universiade
20th-century Japanese people
21st-century Japanese people